South Lancaster Academy (SLA) is a co-educational preparatory day school, consisting of grades Preschool through 12, operated by Seventh-day Adventists in South Lancaster, Massachusetts.
It is a part of the Seventh-day Adventist education system, the world's second largest Christian school system.

History 

On April 19, 1882, the "New England School", yet unnamed, opened its doors.  Nineteen students started classes and five more joined these a few days later. Stephen Nelson Haskell (1833-1922) was the founder and builder of the school; Goodloe Harper Bell (1832-1899) was the first principal.  The following year in 1883, the school was named South Lancaster Academy.

In 1885, the school expanded to include college preparatory.  Teacher training was added in 1886, with development of a "normal school", the J. T. Browning Missionary and Industrial School.

In 1918, its standing as a junior college was formally recognized and the school name was changed to Lancaster Junior College.

In 1922 degree-granting powers were conferred by the Massachusetts legislature.  Once more the school's name was changed to Atlantic Union College with the school beginning to operate on the senior college level, offering a four-year theological course.  During the same period the college became a separate institute with the academy having its own board of trustees and faculty.

Since 1967, South Lancaster Academy has been a twelve-grade school.  The academy attempts to maintain the historic ideals of Seventh-day Adventists on matters of morals, dress, and conduct, as its reasons for existence.  South Lancaster Academy is operated by the SDA churches of Atlantic Union College, Leominster, South Lancaster Village, and Sterling.  South Lancaster Academy is operated by the Southern New England Conference of Seventh-day Adventists and the Atlantic Union Conference of Seventh-day Adventists.

1882 Organized as a preparatory school on Feb 5th, under the leadership of Stephen Nelson Haskell (1833-1922)
1882 On April 19, first day of class for "that New England school"
1883 On Dec 12th, incorporated and formerly named as South Lancaster Academy
1887 In May, certificates were given to thirteen students who had completed the intermediate course of eight grades.
1888 On May 12, first SLA graduation ceremony was held.
1912 On Oct 27th the cornerstone was laid for the new Normal School.
1913 Browning Normal school dedicated
1918 Renamed Lancaster Junior College, after advanced work was carried on for several years in theology, teacher training, and business.
1922 Renamed Atlantic Union College, after offering a four-year theological course and being authorized degree-granting powers conferred by the Massachusetts legislature. The Academy and College became separate institutions with the Academy having its own board of trustees and faculty.
1965 With the opening of Pioneer Valley Academy, SLA was no longer used as a boarding school.
1965 Browning Elementary is re-situated at its current location on George Hill Road.
1967 South Lancaster Academy re-situated at its current location on George Hill Road in South Lancaster, MA.
1985 Administrations of Browning Elementary and South Lancaster Academy are combined into one.
2009 South Lancaster Academy/Browning Elementary is officially renamed to South Lancaster Academy with Browning Elementary being included as part of the school brand but not in title.

Academics
South Lancaster Academy is accredited by the Commonwealth of Massachusetts and Association of Seventh-day Adventist Schools, Colleges, and Universities.

Academics
The required curriculum includes classes in the following subject areas: Religion, English, Oral Communications, Social Studies, Mathematics, Science, Physical Education, Health, Computer Applications, Fine Arts, and Electives.

Spiritual aspects
All students take religion classes each year that they are enrolled. These classes cover topics in biblical history and Christian and denominational doctrines. Instructors in other disciplines also begin each class period with prayer or a short devotional thought, many which encourage student input. Weekly, the entire student body gathers together in the auditorium for an hour-long chapel service.
Outside the classrooms there is year-round spiritually oriented programming that relies on student involvement.

Athletics
South Lancaster Academy offers five main sports:
•Basketball (boys & girls)
•Volleyball (boys & girls)
•Cross Country (boys & girls)
•Soccer Co-Ed
•Baseball (Boys)

Principals 
1882-1884 Goodloe Harper Bell 
1884-1885 Dores Alonzo Robinson
1885-1888 Charles Cornell Ramsay 
1888-1894 George W. Caviness 
1894-1899 Joseph Harvey Haughey 
1899-1907 Frederick Griggs 
1907-1909 Benjamin F. Machlan 
1909-1913 Charles Smull Longacre 
1913-1916 Benjamin F. Machlan 
1916-1917 William G. Worth
1917-1920 Mahlon Elsworth Olsen 
1920-1920 Otto Marion John 
1921-1922 George R. Lehman 
1922- Irvil Atwood Armstrong (1887-1936) First Principal after College faculty separated 
c1930- Linton Garfield Sevrens 
1944-1945 William Burton Higgins 
1945-1952 Chester Everett Kellogg 
c1952- Harold F. Lease 
c1955- Edwin Charles Harkins 
c1961-1966 Lloyd Stanley Davis 
1966-1967 Don Lake
1967-1968 Larue Cook
1968-1969 J. Melvyn Clemons
1969-1970 F. Maynard Yeary
1970-1971 O. E. Torkelson
1971 1973 - Dale Twomley
1973-1976 Don Wright
1976-1989 Alfred Peder Aastrup
1989- 1996 Dr. Ian Kelly
1996 - 2000 Jeff Foote
2000 - 2001 - Gary Force
2001 - 2002 Sandy Durand 
2002-2007 Allyson E. Cram 
2007-2014 Ron Huff
10/2014-7/2015 Theresa Robidoux, Interim
2015–2018 Jeffrey Lambert
2018–present David Branum

See also

 List of Seventh-day Adventist secondary schools
 Seventh-day Adventist education

References 

 Rowena Elizabeth Purdon, That New England School, The College Press, 1956

External links

Adventist secondary schools in the United States
Educational institutions established in 1882
Private high schools in Massachusetts
Schools in Worcester County, Massachusetts
1882 establishments in Massachusetts